The šubara is a type of traditional male winter hat used by the Serbs in folk attire. It is in a conical or cylindrical shape predominantly in black colour, because of the black lamb/sheep fur (woollen). It is a traditional peasant hat used in harsher and colder times.

It was used in the World War I by the Serbian soldiers and by the Chetniks in World War II and again during the Yugoslav Wars. It usually has the cockade (kokarda) of the Serbian eagle or other Serbian symbols.

See also

Serbian Folk attire
Goran Šubara, Australian Serb footballer
Petar Šubara, Yugoslav major (Šubara was a nickname)
Woolen hats used by other peoples:
Ushanka, Hat used in Russia (Soviet fur cap)
Papakhi, Hat used in Caucasia
Karakul, Hat used in Central and South Asia

References

1920s fashion
20th-century fashion
Serbian clothing
Serbian culture
Headgear
Caps
Hats
Woolen clothing
Macedonian clothing
Macedonian culture